Dichomeris turrita is a moth in the family Gelechiidae. It was described by Edward Meyrick in 1914. It is found in Guyana and Brazil.

The forewings are pale fuscous with a large blackish transverse blotch, edged with whitish, occupying the median third of the dorsum, the upper edge projecting furthest posteriorly, where it reaches four-fifths of the way across the wing. The second discal stigma is round, blackish and whitish edged and there is an indistinct rather irregular ochreous-whitish line from two-thirds of the costa to the dorsum before the tornus, edged with fuscous posteriorly. There is a series of dark fuscous dots around the posterior third of the costa and termen. The hindwings are rather dark grey.

References

Moths described in 1914
turrita